Scaphinotus ridingsii is a species of ground beetle in the family Carabidae. It is found in North America.

Subspecies
These two subspecies belong to the species Scaphinotus ridingsii:
 Scaphinotus ridingsii monongahelae Leng, 1917
 Scaphinotus ridingsii ridingsii (Bland, 1863)

References

Further reading

 

Carabinae
Articles created by Qbugbot
Beetles described in 1863